America's Suitehearts: Remixed, Retouched, Rehabbed and Retoxed is a digital EP by American rock band Fall Out Boy, released on April 27, 2009. It contains a remix of the second single "America's Suitehearts" from their fourth studio album Folie à Deux (2008) that was remixed and produced by Blink-182 singer and bassist Mark Hoppus, an acoustic version of America's Suitehearts,  "Lullabye", the pregap hidden track from Folie à Deux, and the music video for "America's Suitehearts".

Track listing

2009 EPs
Fall Out Boy albums
Albums produced by Mark Hoppus
Fueled by Ramen EPs